René Geuna (born 6 February 1943 in Anja, Morocco) is a French fencing master specialized in sabre.

He founded the sabre school of the Amicale tarbaise d'escrime in 1973, where he initiated the collective lessons that built the success of the club. Many of his pupils won World and Olympic titles.

He is known for his technical and educational quality. He coached amongst others the Olympic medallists Philippe Delrieu, Pierre Guichot, Damien Touya, Gaël Touya and Nicolas Lopez, and world champion Anne-Lise Touya.

Bibliography
Duel escrime Est-ce crime ? (Edilivre, 2016)

References

1943 births
Living people
French fencing coaches
French male sabre fencers